The Straits Forum is an annual forum between Mainland China and Taiwan which started in 2009. It is the largest non-political platform which promotes grassroots interaction, economic and trade exchanges and cultural integration.

Forums

1st Forum
The first Straits Forum was held in May 2009 in Xiamen and three other cities in Fujian. It introduced eight preferential policies, including building cross-strait common market activities and encouraging mainland tourists to visit Taiwan.

2nd Forum
The second Straits Forum was held on 19–25 June 2010 in Xiamen and eight other regions in Fujian. The forum consisted of opening ceremony and evening party, policy discussion, cross-strait culture and art exchanges and public carnival. It was themed as expanding the communication among the public across the strait, strengthening the cross-strait cooperation and promoting mutual developments, aiming to construct a platform for cross-strait civil, economic and political exchanges. It saw more than 100 cooperation deals signing, mainly to promote people-to-people exchanges and aviation cooperation.

3rd Forum
The third Straits Forum was held on 11–17 June 2011 in Xiamen, Fujian. The forum focused on grassroots exchanges across the Taiwan Strait. The forum included 13 activities, such as cross-strait folk stories, cultural exchanges and Taiwan temple fairs stage. There were also 15 sub-forums hosted by civil society group on both sides which focused on exchanges pertaining labor union, young people, women and folk beliefs and clan exchanges.

4th Forum
The fourth Straits Forum was held on 16–22 June 2012 in Xiamen, Fujian opened by Jia Qinglin. The forum was themed expand civilian exchanges, boost cross-strait cooperation and promote common development. It featured cultural and economic exchanges, grassroots interactions and communication among people from all walks of life. Special workshops were held on the film and music, press and publication and martial arts sectors. Representatives from Taiwan grassroots farmer and fishermen's associations, congresses of rural citizens, grassroots judicial intermediary organs and community development associations for the first face-to-face communications with their mainland counterparts.

5th Forum
The fifth Straits Forum was held on 16–21 June 2013 in Xiamen, Fujian. Mainland China boosted cross-strait exchanges by introducing a set of preferential policies in the field of legal rights, education, culture and tourism. An additional of 11 provincial entry-exit administration departments in Mainland China will accept applications from Taiwanese who reside in the mainland for their entry permits renewal. The mainland will also open 10 more categories of professional qualification examinations to Taiwan residents, support Taiwan graduates from mainland colleges to start their own businesses and provide subsidies for entrepreneurship training to Taiwanese students. There would be 10 cultural exchanges bases set up in Henan, Fujian and Beijing. Another 11 historical sites would also play the role of cross-strait communication bases. A cross-strait copyright trade center and digital publication base working across the strait would be established in Fujian. Tourist from another 13 mainland cities will be eligible to visit Taiwan as individual tourists.

6th Forum
The sixth Straits Forum was held in June 2014 in Xiamen, Fujian. The forum attracted more than 10,000 Taiwanese representatives from various sectors which participated in 18 major activities in different Fujian cities. The activities included the Matsu Culture Week in Putian which attracted more than 8,000 Matsu followers from Taiwan. Taiwanese who attended the forum including People First Party Secretary-General Chin Chin-sheng, New Party Chairman Yok Mu-ming, Non-Partisan Solidarity Union Chairman Lin Pin-kuan and representative of 22 municipality city and county governments.

7th Forum
The seventh 7-day Straits Forum was held on 14–20 June 2015 in Xiamen, Fujian. The theme of the forum is Focusing on Youth and Serving the Community. During the forum, the Chairman of the National Committee of the Chinese People's Political Consultative Conference Yu Zhengsheng made an announcement to exempt Taiwanese from obtaining the travel permit in the future whenever they want to visit Mainland China. The booklet-format travel permit will be changed to a card, resembling much like the Mainland Travel Permit for Hong Kong and Macao Residents. This is done to facilitate travel between the two sides of the Taiwan Strait. The policy was to go into effect by 1 July 2015.

8th Forum
The eighth Straits Forum was held on 12 June 2016 in Xiamen, Fujian. The theme of the forum was expanding civil exchange, promoting integration development and promoting the sharing and mutual development in civil sectors in various social lives. The forum was opened by Chinese People's Political Consultative Conference Chairman Yu Zhengsheng and attended by Kuomintang Vice Chairman Jason Hu and New Party Chairman Yok Mu-ming, as well as 30 civil groups, 11 members of county and city leaders and speakers and 2,000 participants.

9th Forum
The ninth Straits Forum started on 17 June 2017 in Fujian. The forum focused on broadening people-to-people exchanges and deepening integrated development.

10th Forum
The tenth Straits Forum started on 4 June 2018 in Xiamen, Fujian. The forum focused on enhancing people-to-people interaction, economic exchanges and cultural integration across the strait. On 5 June 2018, a general conference was held. It was then followed by a series of activities for the entire week.

11th Forum
The eleventh Straits Forum was scheduled to be held on 15–21 June 2019 in Beijing. It will be hosted by Chairman of the Chinese People's Political Consultative Conference Wang Yang.

See also
 Cross-Strait relations
 Cross-Strait Economic, Trade and Culture Forum
 Cross-Strait Peace Forum

References

External links
 

Cross-Strait relations
2009 establishments in China
2009 establishments in Taiwan
Organizations established in 2009